The Beaugay Stakes is a Grade III American Thoroughbred horse race for fillies and mares three-years-old and older over a distance of one and one-sixteenth of a mile  at Belmont Park in Elmont, Long Island, New York.

History

The event was inaugurated on 30 December 1978 at Aqueduct Racetrack and run on the dirt track.

The race is named in honor of Elizabeth Arden's Beaugay, the American Champion Two-Year-old of 1945.

In 1979, the Beaugay Handicap was raced in two divisions.  

In 1983 NYRA moved the race to Belmont Park and was run on the turf course in early June.

Due to bad weather in 1998 that severely affected the turf course, the race was run on the dirt track at a distance of one mile.

Records
Speed record: (at  Miles on turf)
 1:39.22 – Strike Charmer (2016)

Margins: 
 6 lengths – Key To The Bridge (1988)

Most wins:
 2 – Summer Secretary (1989, 1991)

Most wins by an owner:
 2 – Bohemia Stable (1984, 1987)
 2 – Edward P. Evans  (1985, 1996)
 2 – Fox Ridge Farm (1988, 1992)
 2 – Peter M. Brant (2019, 2022)

Most wins by a jockey:
 5 – Jerry D. Bailey (1994, 1996, 2000, 2001, 2002)

Most wins by a trainer:
 5 – Chad C. Brown (2014, 2018, 2019, 2020, 2022)

Winners

Legend:

 
 

Notes:

† Ran as part of an entry

See also
List of American and Canadian Graded races

References

Horse races in New York (state)
Graded stakes races in the United States
Turf races in the United States
Mile category horse races for fillies and mares
Recurring sporting events established in 1978
Belmont Park
1978 establishments in New York (state)
Grade 3 stakes races in the United States